Thomas Kidd (born December 15, 1945) is an Australian curler. He is originally from Winnipeg, Manitoba, where he grew up. He later lived in Richmond, British Columbia.  As of 1992, he was living in Melbourne.

At the international level, he is a three-time  curler (1991, 1992, 1993).

He competed at the 1992 Winter Olympics when curling was a demonstration sport; Australian men's team finished on seventh place.

At the national level, he is a three-time Australian men's champion curler (1991, 1992, 1993)

Teams and events

Men's

References

External links

Living people
1945 births
Curlers from Winnipeg
Australian male curlers
Pacific-Asian curling champions
Australian curling champions
Curlers at the 1992 Winter Olympics
Olympic curlers of Australia
Canadian emigrants to Australia
Sportspeople from Melbourne
People from Richmond, British Columbia
Curlers from British Columbia